Leonie Kelly Bennett (born 8 December 1993) is a Dutch cricketer who debuted for the Dutch national side in August 2011. A left-arm orthodox spinner.

Bennett was born in Rotterdam to English parents. After playing for the Dutch under-17 side at the 2009 European Championship, she made her debut for Netherlands A in June 2010, aged only 16. Bennett made her senior debut for the Netherlands in a 20-over double header against Scotland and Ireland at the 2011 European Twenty20 Championship, although only the game against Ireland held Twenty20 International status. Aged 17 years and 250 days, she became the third-youngest Twenty20 International debutant for the Netherlands, behind Miranda Veringmeier and Denise Hannema. Bennett's ODI debut came two days later against Ireland, as part of the one-day European Championship. On debut, she was the third bowler used, after Laura Brouwers and Jolet Hartenhof, but went wicketless, conceding 26 runs from her five overs.

Retained in the Dutch squad for the 2011 World Cup Qualifier in Bangladesh, Bennett went on to play every match at the tournament, including four further ODIs. Notable performances there included 3/20 against Ireland, a match which had ODI status, and 2/11 against Zimbabwe, which did not. At the 2013 World Twenty20 Qualifier in Ireland, Bennett was the tournament's equal leading wicket-taker (alongside Zimbabwean Hazvinei Saili), finishing with seven wickets at an average of 14.57. Her best figures were 3/15 from four overs against Zimbabwe. Outside of international competition, Bennett has been a regular for the Netherlands in the English domestic competitions in which it participates, including the Women's County Championship. However, her 2014 season was curtailed by an ankle injury. Bennett's club cricket is played for SV Kampong.

In August 2019, she was named in the Dutch squad for the 2019 ICC Women's World Twenty20 Qualifier tournament in Scotland.

References

External links

1993 births
Living people
Dutch women cricketers
Dutch people of English descent
Netherlands women One Day International cricketers
Netherlands women Twenty20 International cricketers
Sportspeople from Rotterdam
20th-century Dutch women
20th-century Dutch people
21st-century Dutch women